The Zmeoaică (plural: zmeoaice) is a character of the Romanian mythology. It is a negative character, the wife of a zmeu.

Romanian mythology
Romanian legendary creatures